The following is a timeline of the history of Kansas City, Missouri, United States.

19th century

 1838 - Settlement named "Town of Kansas".
 1846 - Population: 700.
 1840 - City Market active.
 1850 - "City of Kansas" incorporated.
 1854 - Bleeding Kansas
 1857 - Chamber of Commerce established.
 1860 - Population: 4,418.
1863 - August 13: Collapse of the Union Women's Prison kills 4 and maims several other women, the pro-Confederate bushwhackers will cite revenge as a justification for the Sacking of Lawrence.
 1864 - October 23: Battle of Westport.
1867 - March 1: First meeting of the Kansas City Public Schools' Board of Education. 
 1869 - Missouri River railroad bridge opens.
 1870 - Population: 32,260.
 1871 - Kansas City Bar Library Assoc. formed.
 1872 - Elmwood Cemetery established.
 1875 - Fetterman Circulating Library in business.
 1880 - Population: 55,785.
 1882
 Kansas City Club founded.
 First electric lights used in KC; implemented by KCP&L
 1885
 Kansas City Art Institute founded, later attended by Walt Disney
 First overhead electric trolleys in the US used here.
 1889
 "Kansas City" formed by merger of Westport and City of Kansas.
 Kansas City Public Library building opens.
 1890 - Population: 132,716.
 1892 - Court House built.
 1893
 City Hall built.
 Kansas City Athletic Club active.
 1895 - Kansas City School of Law founded.
 1897 - December 20: City workhouse castle opened, old workhouse abandoned.
 1900
 4th July: 1900 Democratic National Convention held. 
 Federal Building constructed.
 Population: 163,752.

20th century

1900s-1940s
 1903 - Automobile Club of Kansas City active.
 1904 - Children's Mercy Hospital active.
 1908 - City Hospital built.
 1909 Kansas City Zoo opens in Swope Park
 1910
 Hall Brothers in business.
 Population: 248,381.
 1913 - Cook Paint and Varnish Company in business.
 1914
 Federal Reserve Bank of Kansas City and Paseo YMCA open.
 Union Station rebuilt.
 1915 - Kansas City Polytechnic Institute established.
 1917 - Rockhurst College opens.
 1919 - Truman and Jacobson's haberdashery in business.
 1920 - Population: 324,410.
 1921 - Laugh-O-Gram Studio founded by Walt Disney
 1922 - WPE radio begins broadcasting.
 1923 Fairyland Amusement Park opens at 7501 Prospect, Laugh-O-Gram Studio files bankruptcy and closes
 1926
 Ararat Shrine Temple and Bagdad Theatre open.
 Liberty Memorial dedicated to World War I veterans, opens
 1927 - Downtown Airport opens, dedicated by Charles Lindbergh
 1928
 June: 1928 Republican National Convention.
 F. W. Woolworth Building constructed.
 1931 - Kansas City Power and Light Building constructed.
 1933 - June 17: Kansas City massacre.
 1936 - Holy Land Christian Mission founded.
 1937 - Kansas City City Hall rebuilt.
 1945 - K.C. native Harry S Truman sworn in as President of the United States after President Franklin Roosevelt's sudden death
 1946
 Linda Hall Library established.
 William E. Kemp becomes mayor.
 1948 
 Harry S Truman wins Presidential election
 First national leadership conference of the Future Homemakers of America (FHA), now Family Career and Community Leaders of America (FCCLA).
 1949
 Crest Drive-In cinema active (approximate date).
 Richard Walker Bolling becomes U.S. representative for Missouri's 5th congressional district.
Industrial Bearings Transmission, now IBT, Inc. founded at 1625 Grand

1950s-1990s
 1951 - July: Great Flood of 1951.
 1954 - U.S. Weather Bureau Severe Local Storms Unit relocated to Kansas City.
1954 - Paseo Bridge opens
 1955 - 
 The city gains its first major professional sports team when the Philadelphia Athletics of the American League relocate to Kansas City
 H. Roe Bartle becomes mayor.
 1956 - First runway opens at Kansas City Industrial Airport, now KCI
 1957
 Kansas City Ballet founded.
 Ruskin Heights Tornado (F-5).
 1959 - 5 KC firefighters killed in gas tank explosion on Southwest Blvd.
 1963
 The Dallas Texans of the American Football League relocate to Kansas City and become the Chiefs
 University of Missouri–Kansas City established.
 Ilus W. Davis becomes mayor.
 1964 - Kansas City Repertory Theatre founded
 1967
 Kansas City Chiefs win American Football League championship and play in first Super Bowl, losing to Green Bay Packers 
 Sister city relationship established with Seville, Spain.
 Athletics relocate to Oakland at the conclusion of the season
 1968 - April: 1968 Kansas City, Missouri riot.
 1969
 Kansas City Royals baseball team formed.,
 Kansas City Chiefs win Super Bowl IV
 1970 - Population: 507,330.
 1971
 Crown Center opens.
 Charles Wheeler becomes mayor.
 1972
 Sister city relationship established with Kurashiki, Japan.
 Arrowhead Stadium opens
 NBA comes to Kansas City when the Cincinnati Royals relocate and become the Kings
 Kansas City International Airport becomes the city's primary passenger airport
 1973
 Sister city relationship established with Morelia, Mexico.
 Worlds of Fun opens.
 Kauffman Stadium opens as Royals Stadium.
 1974
 Kemper Arena opens.
 NHL comes to Kansas City with the establishment of the Scouts as an expansion team
 Sister city relationship established with Freetown, Sierra Leone.
 1976 - World Science Fiction Convention held.
 1977 - Fairyland Amusement Park closes after extensive damage by windstorm
 1978 - Sister city relationship established with Tainan, Taiwan.
 1979 - Richard L. Berkley becomes mayor.
 1980  
 Hyatt Regency hotel opens.
 The Kansas City Royals win the American League pennant before losing in World Series to the Philadelphia Phillies
 1981 - July 17: Hyatt Regency walkway collapse.
 1982
 Kansas City Symphony active.
 Oceans of Fun opens
 1985 - World Series won by Kansas City Royals with Manager Dick Howser
 1986 - Town Pavilion hi-rise built.
 1988
 ACT UP chapter founded.
 One Kansas City Place built.
 Serial killer Bob Berdella apprehended, pleaded guilty to first degree murder, given life in prison sentence
 1989 - Sister city relationship established with Xi'an, China.
 1990 - Population: 435,146.
 1991
 Kansas City Stockyards close.
 Emanuel Cleaver becomes mayor.
 Firefighters' Memorial Fountain dedicated, at 31st & Broadway
 Sister city relationship established with Guadalajara, Mexico.
 1993
 Sister city relationships established with Hannover, Germany and Port Harcourt, Nigeria.
 Great Flood of 1993
 1994 - Bartle Hall Convention Center opens.
 1995 - Sister city relationship established with Arusha, Tanzania.
 1997
 City website online (approximate date).
 Sister city relationship established with San Nicolás de los Garza, Mexico.
 1998 - Sister city relationship established with Ramla, Israel.
 1999 - Kay Barnes becomes mayor.
 2000 - Population: 441,545.

21st century

 2001 - Regional Kansas City SmartPort economic development group established.
 2004 - Sister city relationship established with Metz, France.
 2005
 Penn Valley skatepark opens.
 Emanuel Cleaver becomes U.S. representative for Missouri's 5th congressional district.
 2007
 Sprint Center (arena) opens.
 Irish Museum and Cultural Center active.
 Mark Funkhouser becomes mayor.
 2010
 Population: 459,787.
 Paseo Bridge closed, demolished
 Christopher S. Bond Bridge opens, replacing Paseo Bridge
 2011
 Kauffman Center for the Performing Arts opens.
 Sly James becomes mayor.
 Population: 463,202; metro 2,052,676.
 2012
 Google Fiber service begins.
 Kansas City Startup Village established.
 2014 - Liberty Memorial designated National World War I Monument.
 2015 - World Series won by Kansas City Royals
 2019 - Quinton Lucas elected mayor
2020 - Kansas City Chiefs win Super Bowl LIV
2021 - Chiefs lose Super Bowl LV

See also
 List of mayors of Kansas City, Missouri
 History of the Kansas City metropolitan area
 Timeline of St. Louis

References

Bibliography

Published in 19th century
 Business directory, 1866
 
 

Published in 20th century
 
 
 
 
 
 
 

Published in 21st century

External links

 
 Items related to Kansas City, Mo., various dates (via Digital Public Library of America)

 
 
Kansas City, Missouri
Kansas city
Years in Missouri